Castanheira (Portuguese: chestnut tree) may refer to the following places:

in Brazil
 Castanheira, Mato Grosso, a municipality in the State of Mato Grosso
 Castanheira, Belém, a neighbourhood of the city of Belém, in the State of Pará

in Portugal
 Castanheira (Guarda), a civil parish in the municipality of Guarda
 Castanheira (Mogadouro), a civil parish in the municipality of Mogadouro
 Castanheira (Paredes de Coura), a civil parish in the municipality of Paredes de Coura
 Castanheira (Trancoso), a parish in Trancoso Municipality, Portugal
 Castanheira, a locality of the civil parish of Cós, in the municipality of Alcobaça
 Castanheira de Pera, a municipality in the district of Leiria
 Castanheira de Pera (parish), a civil parish in the municipality of Castanheira de Pera
 Castanheira do Ribatejo, a civil parish in the municipality of Vila Franca de Xira
 Castanheira do Vouga, a civil parish in the municipality of Águeda

See also
Castanheiras
Castanheiro (disambiguation)